The 1978 Open Championship was the 107th Open Championship, held 12–15 July over the Old Course at St Andrews, Fife, Scotland. Jack Nicklaus won his third and final Open championship, two strokes ahead of runners-up Ben Crenshaw, Raymond Floyd, Tom Kite, and Simon Owen. It was the fifteenth of his eighteen major championships and marked the completion of his third career grand slam.

Defending champion Tom Watson was a co-leader after 54 holes, but four consecutive bogeys on the front nine led to a 76 (+4). Watson finished six strokes back in a tie for fourteenth place.

Course

Previous lengths of the course for The Open Championship (since 1950):
  - 1970:
  - 1964
  - 1960, 1955

Past champions in the field

Made both cuts

Source:

Missed the first cut

Source:

Round summaries

First round
Wednesday, 12 July 1978

Source:

Second round
Thursday, 13 July 1978

Source:

Third round
Friday, 14 July 1978

Source:

Amateurs: Miller (+2), Brodie (+4), McEvoy (+5), Godwin (+6).

Final round
Saturday, 15 July 1978

Amateurs: McEvoy (+5), Miller (+6), Brodie (+7), Godwin (+10).

Source:

References

External links
St Andrews 1978 (Official site)
107th Open Championship - St Andrews (European Tour)

The Open Championship
Golf tournaments in Scotland
Open Championship
Open Championship
Open Championship